The Lambert was a British 3-wheeled cyclecar made between 1911 and 1912 by Lambert's Carriage, Cycle and Motor Works of Thetford, Norfolk.

The car was powered by an 8 hp JAP engine mounted at the front and driving the single rear wheel by chain via a three speed gearbox. It was fitted with an open two seater body usually painted in green and grey vertical stripes. It was sold as "The Smartest Car on Three Wheels" and cost £110.

See also 
 List of car manufacturers of the United Kingdom

References
Beaulieu Encyclopedia of the Automobile. G.N. Georgano (editor). year=2000. HMSO London. 

Cyclecars
Defunct motor vehicle manufacturers of England
Three-wheeled motor vehicles
British companies established in 1913
1913 establishments in England
Vehicle manufacturing companies established in 1913